Queen Somanass Waddhanawathy (1834–1852) was the first consort of Mongkut, the King of Siam, and the queen consort though for only nine months. 

Princess Somanass was a daughter of Prince Lakkhananukhun (son of Nangklao) and Ngiu Suvarnadat. Since her father was Phra Ong Chao (Lakkhananukhun was Phra Ong Chao or Second rank Prince because he was a son of The King and royal concubine), Somanass was destined to be Mom Chao (third rank princess). However, King Nangklao (Rama III) who's her grandfather specially granted her the title of Phra Ong Chao (second rank princess)

In 1851, upon his coronation, Mongkut married Princess Somanass, making her the queen. In 1852, she gave birth to a prince: Somdet Chaofa Somanass, but the prince died shortly after birth. Queen Somanass herself died two months after.

Ancestors

References

1834 births
1852 deaths
19th-century Thai women
19th-century Chakri dynasty
People from Bangkok
Thai female Phra Ong Chao
Thai female Mom Chao

Deaths_in_childbirth